Chandranath is a 1984 Bangladeshi film directed by Chashi Nazrul Islam. This is the adaptation of the novel of Sarat Chandra Chattopadhyay's same title. It stars Abdur Razzak, Shuchanda, Doyel and Golam Mustafa in the lead.

Cast
 Abdur Razzak
 Shuchanda
 Doyel
 Golam Mustafa
 Sirajul Islam
 Tapash Chowdhury
 Baby Notun

Soundtrack
The music of this film is directed by Nurul Islam and lyrics were penned by Mohammad Moniruzzaman. Sabina Yasmin, Subir Nandi, Probal Chowdhury sang for this film.
 Phooler Bashor Bhanglo Jokhon - Probal Chowdhury
"Prem Muroti Ghana Shyam" - Sabina Yasmin
"Ei Chokher Lojja" - Sabina Yasmin
"Ei Hridoye Eto Je Kothar Kapon" - Sabina Yasmin
"Mayar Badhon Chhere Chole Jaay" - Subir Nandi

Awards
National Film Award

References

1984 films
1984 drama films
Bengali-language Bangladeshi films
Bangladeshi drama films
Films scored by Khandaker Nurul Alam
1980s Bengali-language films
Films directed by Chashi Nazrul Islam